The Ongin inscription was discovered in 1891 in Mongolia near the Ongi River, 160 km south of the Orkhon inscriptions and 402 km south-west of the Tonyukuk inscriptions. It was erected in honor of El Etmish Yabgu. Line 12 makes it clear that the author of the inscription erected a memorial to his father. According to Gerard Clauson, it must have been erected between 716 and 735, during the reign of Bilge Qaghan. According to Ercilasun it was erected in 719 or 720.

Location
The Ongin inscription was discovered in 1891, in Outer Mongolia on the Manet mountains, near a tributary of the Ongi River, from which it takes its name, at a point a little north-east of 46° N., 102° E., that is about 100 miles south of the Orkhon Inscriptions and some 250 miles west-southwest of the inscription of Tonyukuk.

Discovery and translation

Region
It was found in district Maantyn Burd, the northwest coast of Ongi River in Övörkhangai Province of Mongolia.

Complete text
Following inscription text transcription and translation derived from latest research made by Osawa Takashi in 2011.

Notes

Further reading
 Clauson, G. (1957). The Ongin Inscription. Journal of the Royal Asiatic Society
 Tekin T. (1968). A grammar of Orkhon Turkic.

References 

History of Mongolia
Archaeological sites in Mongolia
1891 archaeological discoveries
8th-century inscriptions
Göktürk inscriptions